Dexter Vidal Williams (born January 6, 1997) is an American football running back for the Philadelphia Stars of the United States Football League (USFL). He played college football at Notre Dame and was drafted by the Green Bay Packers in the sixth round of the 2019 NFL Draft.

College career
Williams attended and played college football at Notre Dame. He contributed from 2015 to 2018, amassing over 1,600 rushing yards and 20 rushing touchdowns in his collegiate career.

Professional career

Green Bay Packers
Williams was drafted by the Green Bay Packers in the sixth round of the 2019 NFL Draft. The Packers traded quarterback Brett Hundley to the Seattle Seahawks in order to obtain the selection used to select Williams. On May 3, 2019, he signed his rookie contract with the Packers. He made his NFL debut on October 20, 2019 during a Week 7 win over the Oakland Raiders, rushing three times for two yards. He saw further action on December 29 during a Week 17 win over the Detroit Lions, temporarily replacing an injured Aaron Jones.

Williams was waived on September 5, 2020, and re-signed to the practice squad five days later. He was elevated to the active roster on October 24 and November 5 for the team's weeks 7 and 9 games against the Houston Texans and San Francisco 49ers, and reverted to the practice squad after each game. He was placed on the practice squad/injured list on November 11, 2020, and restored to the practice squad on December 15. He was elevated again on December 26 for the week 16 game against the Tennessee Titans, and reverted to the practice squad again following the game. He was released on January 23, 2021. On January 25, 2021, Williams signed a reserve/futures contract with the Packers.

On August 31, 2021, Packers released Williams as part of their final roster cuts.

New York Giants
On September 2, 2021, Williams was signed to the New York Giants practice squad. He was released on September 22, 2021. On November 5, 2021, Williams was signed back to the New York Giants practice squad and released four days later.

Cleveland Browns
Williams was signed to the Cleveland Browns' practice squad on November 10, 2021. He was released on November 23, 2021.

Miami Dolphins
On December 13, 2021, Williams was signed to the Miami Dolphins practice squad.

Cleveland Browns (second stint)
Williams was signed to the Cleveland Browns' active roster off the Dolphins' practice squad on January 5, 2022.

Philadelphia Stars
Williams signed with the Philadelphia Stars of the United States Football League on June 29, 2022.

Green Bay Packers (second stint)
On August 10, 2022, Williams signed with the Green Bay Packers He was waived on August 30, 2022.

Philadelphia Stars (second stint)
Williams was selected by the Arlington Renegades in the 2023 XFL Draft, but re-signed with the Stars of the USFL on November 24, 2022.

NFL career statistics

Personal life
Williams is from Winter Garden, Florida and attended Olympia High School before transferring to West Orange High School.

References

External links
Notre Dame Fighting Irish bio

1997 births
Living people
Players of American football from Orlando, Florida
American football running backs
Notre Dame Fighting Irish football players
Green Bay Packers players
New York Giants players
Cleveland Browns players
Miami Dolphins players
Philadelphia Stars (2022) players